Tunnels on Raduč are complex of World War Two military underground tunnels dug deep in the hill Raduč, Murter.

Use 

In a time of the World War II, the tunnels were used as a military hiding spot.
The bunker had 3 cannons that were supposed to defend Murter (also that whole part of Croatian coast) from Italian warship. That almost led to a War between Croatia and Italy. It is unknown what really happened that day.

Today 

Tunnels are today popular touristic destination for everybody who is spending their time on Murter. Tunnels are in complete darkness and whoever is planning going there needs to take a flashlight or any other good source of light.

Around 20% of the tunnels are inaccessible, since the deepest parts were accessible only by ladders, and they unfortunately collapsed.

References 

Croatia in World War II
Tunnels in Croatia